Le Lanceur De Couteaux is a paper cut by Henri Matisse from 1947. It is from Jazz, 1947.

History
Tériade, a noted 20th-century art publisher, arranged to have Matisse's cutouts rendered as pochoir (stencil) prints. The Knife Thrower was a popular print from Henri Matisse's Jazz portfolio of pochoir prints.

Paintings by Henri Matisse
1947 paintings
Paintings in Houston